Xinyi Songde was a planned metro station in Xinyi, Taipei, Taiwan to be served by Taipei Metro. It was cancelled in 2015.

Station overview
The station was planned to be an underground station located slightly east of the Xinyi Road and Songde Road intersection under Xinyi Road. It would be built as part of Xinyi Line's Eastern Extension and would be a two-level, underground station with an island platform.

Planned layout

References

Proposed Taipei Metro stations